False Divi Point is a low headland located at the northern terminus of the Coromandel Coast, within the state of Andhra Pradesh of southeastern India.

Geography
The headlands point is located at the eastern apex of the Krishna River Delta, within the South India Region. The area is low, swampy, and dominated by Mangrove wetlands habitats.

False Divi Point is used geographically to define northern end of the Coromandel Coast region.

See also 
Geography of Andhra Pradesh
2003 North Indian Ocean cyclone season - Severe Cyclonic Storm (03B)

References

Headlands of India
Coromandel Coast
Landforms of Andhra Pradesh
Krishna River
Mangroves